The Maiden of the Grave (Portuguese: Aparição do Anjo a S. Roque) is an oil on canvas painting by Gaspar Dias, from 1584.

Description
It is in the collection of the Igreja de São Roque, in Lisbon.

Analysis
The scene shows an angel visitation to Saint Roch for survival during a time of plague.

References

1584 paintings
Paintings in Lisbon
Portuguese paintings